Benjamin Hampton may refer to:

 Ben Hampton (born 1992), Australian rugby player
 Benjamin B. Hampton (1875–1932), American film producer